Geaves is a surname. Notable people with the surname include:

Fiona Geaves (born 1967),  English squash player
Richard Geaves (1854–1935), Mexican footballer
Ron Geaves (born 1948), English religious studies professor

See also
Gleaves
Graves (surname)